Cv Caboclo (V19) is an  of the Brazilian Navy. Caboclo was the fifth of the Imperial Marinheiro-class corvettes ordered by the Brazilian Navy in 1953. Caboclo was launched on 19 August 1954, and commissioned on 16 July 1955.

History
The Cv Caboclo (V19) are the fourth ship to bear this name in the Brazilian Navy.

In June 2009, Caboclo participated in the recovery mission of the wreckage of Air France Flight 447.

References

Corvettes of the Brazilian Navy
1954 ships
Ships built in the Netherlands
Corvettes of the Netherlands
Naval ships of Brazil